CEFC may refer to:

 Clean Energy Finance Corporation
 Covenant Evangelical Free Church
 Crouch End Festival Chorus
 CEFC China Energy – a private Chinese conglomerate
Christ Evangelical Free Church